Loandjili (Lo-anh-ji-li) is a district in the city of Pointe-Noire in the Republic of the Congo. Its population is approximately 22,000. Loandjili is also known by the name Louantili.

Location
Loandjili is located in Pointe-Noire, which is on the west coast of Africa. It is North of Cabinda and located close to Diosso and Hinda.

References

Pointe-Noire